Martin Jellinghaus (born 26 October 1944) is a retired West German former athlete who competed mainly in the 400 metres.

He competed for West Germany in the 1968 Summer Olympics held in Mexico City, Mexico in the 4×400 metre relay where he won the bronze medal with his teammates Helmar Müller, Manfred Kinder and Gerhard Hennige. During the games, along with the Australian sprinter Peter Norman, he wore Olympic Project for Human Rights badges to show support for the suspended American sprinters Tommie Smith and John Carlos, the two gold and bronze medalists in the men's 200-meter race, who took their places on the podium for the medal ceremony barefooted and wearing civil rights badges, lowering their heads and each defiantly raising a black-gloved fist as The Star-Spangled Banner was played.

References

1944 births
Living people
West German male sprinters
Olympic bronze medalists for West Germany
Athletes (track and field) at the 1968 Summer Olympics
Athletes (track and field) at the 1972 Summer Olympics
Olympic athletes of West Germany
European Athletics Championships medalists
Medalists at the 1968 Summer Olympics
Olympic bronze medalists in athletics (track and field)
Universiade medalists in athletics (track and field)
Universiade silver medalists for West Germany
People from Lauf an der Pegnitz
Sportspeople from Middle Franconia
Medalists at the 1970 Summer Universiade